Lovelite Chrissa Detenamo (born 22 December 1993) is a Nauruan sprinter.

Detenamo made her first appearance on the world stage at the 2009 World Youth Championships in Athletics in Brixen, Italy. She was among the 16 athletes selected from Pacific Islands nations for the championships. Running in the 100 metres event, she failed to qualify for the quarter-finals, but she still set a new personal best of 13.32 seconds.

Detenamo was one of the two athletes who represented Nauru at the 2012 IAAF World Indoor Championships, Istanbul, Turkey. She set a new national record in the 60 metres event with an 8.04 seconds time.

Personal bests

Competition record

References

Living people
1993 births
Nauruan female sprinters
Commonwealth Games competitors for Nauru
Athletes (track and field) at the 2014 Commonwealth Games
World Athletics Championships athletes for Nauru
Athletes (track and field) at the 2010 Summer Youth Olympics